WOUB (1340 AM) is a public radio station in Athens, Ohio. Unlike its FM counterpart, WOUB-FM, WOUB AM is generally more of a community radio station, with mainly programming for residents of Athens County, plus alternative music programming, and news from the BBC, among other programs.

Owned and operated by Ohio University, WOUB is on the air daily from 6a.m. to midnight.

Images

External links
WOUB official website

WOUB (AM)
OUB
Ohio University
Mass media in Athens, Ohio